Robert Dunkley (6 April 1922 – 2000) was an English footballer who played in the Football League for Barrow.

Career
Dunkley was born in Stoke-on-Trent and joined Stoke City during World War II. He made three appearances for Stoke in 1940–41 scoring once against Notts County. He was called up for army service to fight in the war in 1942 and never played for the club again. After the end of the war he spent a season for Barrow playing 11 times.

Career statistics

References

1922 births
2000 deaths
English footballers
Stoke City F.C. players
Barrow A.F.C. players
English Football League players
Association football forwards